Robert Freeman Smith (June 16, 1931September 21, 2020), commonly known as Bob Smith, was an American Republican politician who represented Oregon in the United States House of Representatives from 1983 to 1995 and from 1997 to 1999.

Early life and education
Smith was born in Portland, Oregon, and grew up in Burns, Oregon. His father, Benjamin F. Smith, was a doctor. He attended Willamette University in Salem, Oregon, graduating in 1953 with a bachelor's degree in agriculture. He worked as a rancher until his election to the Oregon House of Representatives in 1960.

Career

Smith served in the state House until he retired in 1972 to return to his ranch. He was Speaker of the House for the 1969 and 1971 sessions. Between 1965 and 1969, Smith was the president of the Oregon Public Land Commission.

After more than a decade out of politics, Smith was elected to Congress from Oregon's 2nd congressional district in 1982. The district's incumbent, freshman Republican Denny Smith (no relation), opted to run in the newly created 5th district after it absorbed much of the western portion of the old 2nd, including Denny Smith's home in Salem. Smith served in Congress until 1995. After a brief retirement, he returned to Congress in 1997. Wes Cooley, the Republican who had succeeded Smith in the House, had been caught in several lies about his military service and Smith was persuaded to come out of retirement. Upon his return, he was elected chairman of the House Agriculture Committee, but only served one term before retiring for good.

Personal life
On February 19, 1966, Smith married Kaye Elizabeth Tomlinson in Salem. Her father was the clerk of Marion County. The wedding was attended by F. F. Montgomery, the Speaker of the Oregon House of Representatives, among others. By January 1971, Smith and his wife had two sons and a daughter.

Car wreck 
On February 8, 2016, Smith struck and killed a pedestrian while driving in Medford, Oregon. The pedestrian was in the crosswalk when Smith hit him with his car, and he later died at the scene. Smith did not flee the scene, was cooperative with investigators, and was determined to not be under the influence of intoxicants at the time of the wreck. No charges or citations were filed against him regarding the wreck.

Death 
Smith died on September 21, 2020, in Medford, Oregon at the age of 89.

References

External links

 

1931 births
2020 deaths
Willamette University alumni
Speakers of the Oregon House of Representatives
People from Burns, Oregon
Republican Party members of the United States House of Representatives from Oregon
Ranchers from Oregon
Politicians from Portland, Oregon
20th-century American politicians